Theoleptus is a Greek name. Notable historical figures with this name include:

 Theoleptos of Philadelphia
 Theoleptus I of Constantinople
 Theoleptus II of Constantinople

Greek given names